Central Bureau of Narcotics (CBN : केंद्रीय नारकोटिक्स ब्यूरो) is affiliated with India's Department of Revenue (IRS) and regulated by the country's Central Board of Indirect Taxes and Customs. The main function of CBN is to stop opium production and trade, and to issue licenses for production of legal synthetic drugs. The Central Bureau of Narcotics headquarters is located at Gwalior.

The incumbent Commissioner of Central Bureau of Narcotics is an Indian Revenue Service (IRS) officer, Mr. Dinesh Bouddh IRS.

Organization 
The Central Bureau of Narcotics (CBN) is headed by the Narcotics Commissioner of India, who belongs to the Indian Revenue Service (IRS) and is the Joint Secretary to the Government of India. The Narcotics Commissioner of India is assisted by three Deputy Narcotics Commissioners (DNC), who are in charge of units in the opium-growing states, such as Madhya Pradesh, Rajasthan and Uttar Pradesh. The Class I officers in the Central Bureau of Narcotics are officers of the Indian Revenue Service (Customs & Central GST). Their offices are located at Neemuch, Kota and Lucknow respectively.

Each unit consists of a number of divisional offices headed by a District Opium Officer (Group 'B' Gazetted Officer), who is in charge of poppy cultivation aspects such as licensing of cultivators, measurement of poppy fields and collection of opium. In addition, there is a Preventive & Intelligence Cell (P&I Cell), which is headed by superintendents (Group 'B' Gazetted Officer). The P&I Cell looks after the enforcement aspects of both the District Opium Officers and Superintendents. Officers report to the Deputy Narcotics Commissioners that heads their Unit.

The Narcotics Commissioner is assisted by two Deputy Narcotics Commissioners (DNCs) and two Assistant Narcotics Commissioners (ANCs), along with other support staff and officers. Along with supervision of opium poppy cultivation, the headquarters office also issues authorizations for the import/export of NDPS and other related work. The office is headed by the Joint/ Additional Commissioner of the Indian Revenue Service (Customs and Central GST), who is designated as Deputy Narcotics Commissioner (DNC). Each unit controls Opium Divisions and Preventive and Intelligence Cells for the supervision of cultivation and effective preventive work. These offices are headed by District Opium Officers and Superintendents respectively.

Each Division is further divided into ranges headed by a Sub-Inspector (SI) officer, who measures the poppy cultivation area in his range. The Range office maintains all the records of licensed poppy cultivators and assists the District Opium Officers in settlement, licensing, measurement, etc. The work of a Range SI is supervised by an Inspector (Cultivation). Each District Opium Officer also has an Inspector (Preventive), who undertakes preventive and enforcement functions in the Division.

The Preventive and Intelligence Cells have been entrusted with the responsibility of enforcing the provisions of the NDPS Act relating to search, seize etc.

Duties 

 Supervision over licit cultivation of opium poppy in India spread across 22 Districts 102 Tehsils/Parganas in the States of Madhya Pradesh, Rajasthan and Uttar Pradesh.
 Preventive and enforcement, functions especially in the three poppy-growing States.
 Investigation of cases under the NDPS Act 1985 and filing of complaint in the Court.
 Action for tracing and freezing of illegally acquired property as per the provisions of Chapter V-A of the NDPS Act, 1985.
 Issue of licenses for manufacture of synthetic narcotic drugs.
 Issuance of Export Authorizations/ Import Certificate for export/import of Narcotic Drugs and Psychotropic Substances.
 Issuance of No Objection Certificate (NOC) for import/export of selected number of Precursor Chemicals.
 Import of poppy seed or poppy seeds are permitted only for Australia, Austria, France, China, Hungary, the Netherlands, Poland, Slovenia, Spain, Turkey and the Czech Republic on production of an appropriate certificate from the Competent Authority of the exporting country that the opium has been grown licitly/ legally in that country. All import contracts, for this must be registered with the Narcotics Commissioner, Gwalior (Madhya Pradesh) prior to import.

Field Formations 

Central Bureau of Narcotics has 17 cultivation divisions situated at Neemuch, Mandsaur, Jaora, Kota, Bareilly, etc. which are headed by District Opium Officer and 16 Preventive and Intelligence Divisions situated at Delhi, Indore, Jaipur, Lucknow, etc. which are headed by Superintendents.
The headquarters are situated at Mall Road, Morar in Gwalior (Madhya Pradesh) which is headed by Narcotics Commissioner.

See also 
 Central Excise (India)
 Central Board of Excise and Customs
 Directorate of Revenue Intelligence
 Directorate General of Central Excise Intelligence
 Service tax in India
 Value added tax

References 

Federal law enforcement agencies of India
Year of establishment missing
Drugs in India